St George's Church of England School is a mixed all-through school and sixth form located in Gravesend in the English county of Kent.

The school was founded in 1580, and is administered by the Church of England Diocese of Rochester. The school was converted to academy status in November 2011, and was previously a voluntary aided school under the control of Kent County Council. The school continues to coordinate with Kent County Council for admissions.

St George's Church of England School offers GCSEs, BTECs and OCR Nationals as programmes of study for pupils, while students in the sixth form have the option to study from a range of A Levels and further BTECs.

It was also the school of Alec Shelbrooke, Member of Parliament for Elmet and Rothwell.

References

External links
St George's Church of England School official website

Secondary schools in Kent
Church of England secondary schools in the Diocese of Rochester
Educational institutions established in the 1580s
1580 establishments in England
Academies in Kent
Primary schools in Kent